Void Moon is the ninth novel by American crime author Michael Connelly. It was released in the UK in 2000 and was the third of Connelly's books not to follow the character Harry Bosch.  It was also his first novel to feature a female protagonist, Cassidy "Cassie" Black, and a protagonist who is a criminal instead of an investigator of criminals.

Plot summary
Cassie Black is an ex-convict who works at a Porsche dealership. She had served five years in prison for conspiring with her previous partner-in-crime, Max Freeling, to steal the winnings of casino visitors while they are asleep. The last plan failed when an undercover agent (later revealed as Jack Karch) posed as the victim, forcing Max to take his own life. Unknown to all, Cassie and Max have a daughter named Jodie, who was born when Cassie served her time in prison. The daughter was put up for adoption and Cassie has been tracking her development silently.

When Cassie learns that her daughter will be moving to Paris with her adopted parents in the near future, she decides to return to the trade for the last big pay day. Once she gets hold of the money, she plans to bring Jodie away with her. She approaches Max's half brother, Leo Renfro, for a heist job. Leo assigns her to go back to the Cleopatra, or "Cleo", the casino which Max's failed attempt took place. The victim ("mark") this time is apparently a high roller and a $500,000 reward awaits. Leo is confident of Cassie's capabilities despite her long hiatus, but warns her to avoid being in the mark's hotel room during the period of the "void moon" on the day of action. Max's death, along with other unpleasant things, have occurred during that period. Cassie successfully breaks into the hotel room of the mark in the wee hours of the morning, but is forced to remain hidden in the room during the period of the void moon due to unforeseen circumstances. Later that morning, it is revealed that the mark has been shot dead and the suitcase containing the money had been taken from the safe.

The mark was actually a courier for Miami's Cuban 'Mafia' and he was carrying $2.5 million in the suitcase as partial payoff for rights to buy over the Cleo. The chief of security at the Cleo, Vincent Grimaldi, hires private investigator Jack Karch to recover the money. Jack is briefed by Grimaldi that Leo Renfro is in cahoots with the Chicago Mafia for this crime. He successfully tracks down the supplier of Cassie's equipment for the theft and obtains Cassie's name. Meanwhile, Cassie persuades Leo to split the money and leave after learning of its origin. Leo requests two days to sort the mess out, but commits suicide when confronted by Jack about Cassie. The next day, Jack poses as a customer at the Porsche showroom and Cassie takes him out for a car ride. Cassie successfully crashes the car upon learning about Jack's motive and returns to Leo's house to retrieve the money. Jack planned to ambush Cassie at her house but instead, critically wounds the parole officer once he learns of Cassie's daughter, Jodie. Jack successfully "abducts" Jodie before the police arrive and drives her to the Cleo to set up a meeting with Cassie three hours later. Unknown to Jack, Cassie arrives much earlier and devises a plan to rescue Jodie and frame Jack in the process.

Grimaldi captures Jack and reveals to him that the whole plan was a setup because the Miami gangsters would never be approved to buy the Cleo. The Chicago Mafia was never involved. His thugs killed the courier, and Miami will now search for the soon-to-be dead Karch as the thief. Using a concealed weapon, Karch surprises and kills the thugs and Grimaldi in the elevator. He returns to the room to the surprise of Cassie and Jodie, but, momentarily distracted, allows Cassie to attack him and push him out of the window to his death (the same way that Max had died, and that Karch had planned to kill her and Jodie). Cassie throws some money out of the window to cause a commotion, allowing Jodie and her to slip out unnoticed.

On the way back to L.A., Cassie realizes she will be unable to provide an enjoyable life for Jodie if the police suspect her (Cassie) of all the crimes that Karch has committed. Instead, Cassie returns Jodie home to her adoptive parents and drives off with the remainder of the money.

Comments
Cassie Black makes a cameo appearance (using her new name) in The Narrows (2004) and is referenced by attorney Mickey Haller as a former client in The Brass Verdict (2008). In A Darkness More Than Night, Terry McCaleb sees a banner at the police station that reads "Welcome Back Thelma!", an obvious reference to the parole officer's injuries. The injured parole officer appears again in The Closers (2005) during one of Bosch's investigations, and Bosch recognizes Cassie's mugshot in a newspaper article in her cubicle.

Notes

2000 American novels
Novels by Michael Connelly
Novels set in the Las Vegas Valley
Little, Brown and Company books